Amalie Malka Beer (10 February 1767 – 27 June 1854) was a German Jewish philanthropist, communal worker, and salonnière.

Biography
Amalie Malka Wolff was born in Berlin to Prussian court factor  (1745–1812) and his wife Esther, née Bamberger (1740–1822). In 1788 she married the Jewish sugar manufacturer Jacob Herz Beer (1769–1825). A maternal uncle of Wulff's, Hirsch Bamberger (1733-1782), was an ancestor of jazz musician Tony Russell.

Beer was an active member of the Women's Aid Society for Wounded Soldiers, which was conducted under the patronage of Prince Wilhelm of Prussia. In consideration of her valuable services, she received from the king the Order of Queen Louise, being the first Jewish woman to be so distinguished. Beer achieved fame with her literary salon at Tiergartenstraße, which was honoured occasionally by the king's presence.

Amalie Beer was the mother of poet Michael Beer, composer Giacomo Meyerbeer, astronomer Wilhelm Beer, and one other son, Heinrich.

References

External links
 

1767 births
1854 deaths
Burials at Schönhauser Allee Cemetery, Berlin
German salon-holders
18th-century German Jews
People from Berlin